Çaldıran is a district and town in Van Province of Turkey.

As mayor Leyla Atsak from the Peoples' Democratic Party (HDP) was elected in the local elections of March 2019. However Leyla Atsak was barred from holding office by the Supreme Election Board (YSK), despite being approved as a candidate by the YSK before the elections due to have being dismissed from public office in the past.  Şefık Ensari from the Justice and Development Party (AKP) who came in second in the elections was given the mayorship instead. Adem Can became the Kaymakam in September 2019.

The town is in an earthquake prone area; 3,840 people were killed by a 7.2 magnitude earthquake in 1976.

In the district was found an archaeological site of a former building on a hill 2000 m above sea level.

Archaeology
In June 2022, Turkish-Mongolian archaeologists led by Ersel Çağlıtütuncigil announced the discovery of the ruins of a summer palace (caravanserai) thought to have been constructed by the Mongol Ilkhanate State ruler Hulagu Khan and decorated with swastika or "tamga" shaped roof tiles in the 1260s. Ceramic kilns, tricolor-glazed ceramics, bricks, glazed roof tiles, porcelain were also among the finds.

Climate 
Summers are mild and dry and winters are cold and snowy, with very low temperatures, due to its elevation. The lowest temperature recorded in Çaldıran is -46.4 °C on 9 January 1990 and It is also the lowest temperature recorded in Turkey.

References

See also
Battle of Çaldıran

Populated places in Van Province
Districts of Van Province
Kurdish settlements in Turkey